Astan Janan is an album of Persian traditional music composed by Bayat Zand and sung by Bayat e Kurd with the voice of Mohammad Reza Shajarian, which was performed at the Italian Embassy in Tehranex in 1983 and released in 1985. The album was composed by Parviz Meshkatian. The lyrics of this album are composed by Hafez and Baba Tahir.

Track listing

References

External links
Official website

Mohammad-Reza Shajarian albums
1985 albums
1980s classical albums